Harrison Road may mean:

Harrison Road (Ohio), the former name for part of U.S. Route 52 west of Cincinnati, Ohio, United States
Mahatma Gandhi Road, Kolkata, in the Indian city of Kolkata (previously known as Calcutta).